This article is about the characters that have appeared in the books of The Railway Series by the Rev. Wilbert Awdry and Christopher Awdry. Unless otherwise stated on this page, the technical notes come from actual notes laid out by Wilbert Awdry when he was developing the characters and setting for his stories; these notes are cited in his publication The Island of Sodor: Its People, History, and Railways.

North Western Railway
These are the main rolling stock of the North Western Railway (NWR), commonly referred to as the Fat Controller's railway:

Steam engines

The Eight Main Engines

Thomas (Number 1) 

Thomas is a blue  ex-London, Brighton and South Coast Railway E2 class locomotive.

Edward (Number 2) 
Edward is an old blue  ex-Furness Railway K2 class locomotive. He is the first character to appear in The Railway Series. He is a blue mixed-traffic tender engine who works on the North Western Railway and is the railway's number 2 engine. He runs his own branch line with BoCo, which travels from Wellsworth to Brendam.

Henry (Number 3)
Henry was originally a  designed by Sir Nigel Gresley. He was built circa 1919 and arrived on Sodor in 1922 when Sir Topham Hatt was swindled into buying him. There have been two Railway Series books devoted to him: Henry the Green Engine and Henry and the Express.

Awdry originally planned to write Henry out of the series, because C. Reginald Dalby's drawings made him look too similar to Gordon. After getting various letters from children about the character, Awdry changed his mind and in the sixth book, Henry the Green Engine, Henry is damaged in an accident and rebuilt offsite at Crewe Works to the design of the Stanier "Black Five". Henry is painted green with red stripes, and can sometimes come across as arrogant and rude, but he does work hard and has even been called an "'enterprising engine'".

Henry was the central character in a controversial Railway Series story. In 'Henry's Sneeze', the character blasts some troublemaking schoolboys with soot and they "ran away as black as niggers". In 1972, articles in the British press raised this as an example of racism. Awdry claimed that it was a case of oversensitivity on the part of the race relations board, but he apologized and changed the offending sentence to "as black as soot", which has been used in subsequent editions of the book.

Gordon (Number 4)
Gordon is a big blue  ('Pacific') ex-London and North Eastern Railway Gresley Class A1 locomotive.

James (Number 5)

James is a modified red  ('Mogul') ex-Lancashire & Yorkshire Railway Class 28 mixed-traffic locomotive. Built in 1912-13, he was sold to the NWR still painted in L&Y black livery by the London Midland & Scottish Railway in 1925. Following James's crash on his first day, he was repaired at the Works at Crovan's Gate and painted red with black (later blue) and gold stripes.

In the Author's Note of James the Red Engine (where James first appeared properly), it states that the nationalisation of British railways has just happened.

Percy (Number 6)
Percy is a green  tank engine and Thomas' best friend.

Toby (Number 7)

Toby is a blue and brown  tram engine, of the Great Eastern Railway's class C53.

Duck (Number 8/5741)
Duck (real name Montague; No. 8, but displays his ex-GWR number, 5741) is an  ex-Great Western Railway 5700 Class locomotive.

Donald and Douglas (Numbers 9 and 10)
Donald and Douglas are identical black  ex-Caledonian Railway locomotives of the 652 Class who arrived on Sodor from Glasgow, Scotland in 1959. Knowing that one of them would have been scrapped if left behind, they made quiet arrangements with their crews to travel together minus visible numbers and hope for the best. Although the Fat Controller had only purchased one engine and intended to send the other back to Scotland, he changed his mind after hearing how hard they worked clearing the lines of heavy snow, and decided to keep both engines.

Oliver (Number 11/1436)
Oliver (No. 11, but displays his ex-GWR number, 1436) is an  ex-Great Western Railway 1400 Class locomotive, who 'escaped' from the Other Railway where he was due to be scrapped. The GWR 1400 class engines were fitted with a connector system allowing the driver to control the locomotive remotely from the cab of an 'autocoach', such as Isabel.

He first appears in the book Enterprising Engines, where he was caught in a tough spot so close to reaching Sodor and he was rescued by Douglas. His escape made him popular with the other engines. He was built in 1934 and arrived on Sodor in 1967 where he was restored, painted GWR green. He was allocated number 11 on the North Western Railway, but was allowed to keep his GWR number '1436'. He was assigned to work with Duck on his branch line, and has been happily based there ever since despite his initial trouble with ballast trucks.

Diesel engines

Daisy (Number D1)
Daisy is a green diesel railcar based on the British Rail Class 101 in a unique single car configuration. She was built in 1960 and arrived on Sodor specially for use on the Ffarquhar branch line (Thomas' branch line). She was highly opinionated about her functions at first, but after her humiliation from a stray bull, she made more effort to settle in. She first appeared in the book Branch Line Engines.

BoCo (Number D2/D5702)
BoCo is a green Co-Bo mixed-traffic diesel locomotive, who works mainly on Edward's Branch Line (the Brendam branch line), but can also be seen working on The Main Line. BoCo is a Metropolitan-Vickers Type 2  diesel-electric locomotive, named after its wheel arrangement, which is known as "Co-Bo". In the Railway Series, BoCo carries his North Western Railway number 'D2', whereas in the television series he carries the number D5702. He first appeared in the book Main Line Engines. He was built in 1958 and arrived on Sodor in 1965.

Bear (Number D3) / D7101
Bear was originally known as D7101 and is based on the British Rail Class 35. He first arrived on the Island of Sodor on a trial for The Fat Controller. He was accompanied by another diesel engine, D199, who talked about taking over the railway, which D7101 didn't like. After D7101 suffered from a failed injector and was helped by Henry, he befriended Henry, and The Fat Controller decided to give him a second chance whilst D199 was sent packing.  D7101 was given a new name, "Bear", a new number, D3, and a new coat of paint. Nowadays Bear backs up Gordon on his Express duties, and works local passenger trains turnabout with Henry and James.

Pip and Emma
Pip (short for Philippa) and Emma are the two class 43 power cars which top and tail an InterCity 125 trainset. They had experienced problems with their cooling system and came to the railway when Gordon was deputising for an excursion train on the Other Railway.

They appeared three times, in Gordon the High-Speed Engine, Thomas and the Fat Controller's Engines and Thomas and His Friends. Following Privatisation, the Fat Controller decided to purchase them in order to run a faster service to London.

Other rolling stock
Annie and Clarabel are Thomas' regular coaches who work with him as a Push-pull train on his branch line, enabling Thomas to stay at one end for his return journeys from Knapford. Annie only takes passengers while Clarabel has a composite layout in which she also has a compartment for luggage and the guard, and a drivers' cabin at her rear end. Thomas sometimes sings them songs to keep up a good rhythm as he travels along with them, and they love to sing back. 

 Henrietta is Toby's four-wheeled Great Eastern Railway coach. 

Isabel, Dulcie, Alice and Mirabel are Great Western Railway autocoaches who work with Oliver (Isabel and Dulcie) and Duck (Alice and Mirabel), on The Little Western.

 Toad is Oliver and Douglas' brake van that was saved when Douglas helped Oliver and Isabel escape from the Other Railway. Toad requested to be Douglas's brake van in deep gratitude for the latter's actions, which he felt greatly humbled by.

 The Spiteful Brake Van is a brake van that was smashed to pieces when Douglas helped James up Gordon's hill.

Skarloey Railway
Skarloey Railway locomotives all have real-life equivalents: numbers 1-7 and 9 of locomotives on the Talyllyn Railway; and number 8 is based on Prince on the Ffestiniog Railway.

Skarloey (Number 1)
Skarloey is named after Skarloey Lake, the northernmost point for passengers on the Skarloey Railway. Skarloey's equivalent on the Talyllyn Railway is Talyllyn. He was built in 1864 and arrived on Sodor the following year. He first appeared in Four Little Engines. The story of his early years was told in Very Old Engines, where it was revealed he was overly excitable and eager to make an impression before becoming a humbler and dedicated engine. Skarloey was laid to one side in 1943 when he was worn out, but was hastily reinstated during the events of Old Faithful. Between 1955-57 Skarloey was overhauled in England and he returned to regular service in 1958.

Rheneas (Number 2)
Rheneas is named after Rheneas station on the Skarloey Railway. He was built in 1865 by Fletcher, Jennings & Co. of Whitehaven, the same company that built Skarloey. They are the oldest working engines on the Island of Sodor. Rheneas is more cautious than Skarloey, and is known as the "Gallant Old Engine", as he kept the railway running during the turbulent period when Skarloey was in poor mechanical shape. His equivalent engine on the Talyllyn Railway is Dolgoch. In Four Little Engines, he was sent away to be overhauled and did not return until Gallant Old Engine.

Sir Handel (Number 3)
Sir Handel (originally Falcon) is named after Sir Handel Brown, the owner of the Skarloey Railway. He is based on the Talyllyn Railway locomotive Sir Haydn. In the 1980s, he was invited to the Talyllyn Railway. The real Talyllyn Railway had paid tribute to The Railway Series by repainting their locomotive Sir Haydn to resemble Sir Handel. Sir Handel first appeared in Four Little Engines.

Peter Sam (Number 4)
Peter Sam is named after The Thin Controller Peter Sam, the manager of the Skarloey Railway. Peter Sam is based on the Talyllyn Railway locomotive Edward Thomas. He was built in 1920 by Kerr Stuart and Co. in Stoke-on-Trent, for the Mid Sodor Railway and was given the name Stuart and painted green. Like Sir Handel, he was later sold to the Sodor Aluminium Company and then in 1951 to the Skarloey Railway. Following an accident with some slate trucks, he lost his funnel and was fitted with a Giesl ejector. In the 1990s he was sent to the Talyllyn Railway. As with Sir Handel, this was based on real life events when the Talyllyn Railway repainted Edward Thomas as Peter Sam. He first appeared in Four Little Engines.

Rusty (Number 5)
Rusty is named after his builders, Ruston & Hornsby. He is a black , acquired direct from the manufacturers in 1957. He is based on the Talyllyn Railway locomotive Midlander. He first appeared in the book The Little Old Engine.

Duncan (Number 6)
He was purchased second-hand, as a spare engine when Peter Sam had an accident at the quarry. He is based on the Talyllyn Railway locomotive Douglas. He first appeared in the book The Little Old Engine.

Ivo Hugh (Number 7)
Ivo Hugh is named after Ivo Hugh, the Chief Mechanical Engineer of the Skarloey Railway and Rustys driver. He is based on the Talyllyn Railway locomotive Tom Rolt. He was built in the mid-1990s in the Skarloey Railway's workshops, at Crovan's Gate. He first appeared in New Little Engine.

Duke (Number 8)
Duke is named after The Duke of Sodor. He is based on the Ffestiniog Railway locomotive Prince, one of the four engines in the Ffestiniog Railway's 'Small England class'. He was built in 1879 for the opening of the Mid Sodor Railway the following year. He was named The Duke', after the Duke of Sodor. This name was later shortened to "Duke". He first appeared in Duke the Lost Engine.

Fred (Number 9)
Fred is the railway's second diesel locomotive. He is based on the Talyllyn Railway locomotive Alf. He is mentioned in New Little Engine. According to Sodor: Reading Between the Lines, he entered service in 1989, having been acquired from the National Coal Board.

Culdee Fell Mountain Railway
The Culdee Fell Railway climbs to the top of Sodor's highest mountain, which shares the railway's name. It is based on the Snowdon Mountain Railway in North Wales, was opened in 1900, and for many years was operated under the direction of Mr. Walter Richards, the General Manager. It appears in one book, Mountain Engines. The locomotives on the line are all s.

Godred (Number 1)
Godred was the original engine on the railway, and is named after one of Sodor's historical rulers. Shortly after the railway opened, he lost contact with the rack rail at a loosened rail-joint and plunged over a cliff. Godred was so badly damaged that he was scrapped, with his parts being used to repair the other engines. This incident is based directly upon the Snowdon Mountain Railway's opening day accident when their  1 Ladas suffered a similar accident.

Culdee (Number 4)
Culdee is the principal engine on the mountain railway. He is based on No. 4 Snowdon. When introduced in Mountain Engine, he had been overhauled in Switzerland in 1962-63 and was on the last stage of his journey home. Culdee mainly works with his own coach named Catherine.

Lord Harry/Patrick (Number 6)
Lord Harry/Patrick arrived in 1962 and was named after the manager. He is based on No. 6 Padarn.

Other locomotives 
No. 2 Ernest, No. 3 Wilfred and No. 5 Shane Dooiney arrived alongside Godred and Culdee for the railway's opening. No. 7 Alaric and No. 8 Eric arrived with Lord Harry in 1962-63.

Arlesdale Railway
The Arlesdale Railway is Sodor's smallest railway. It is based on the Ravenglass & Eskdale Railway in Cumbria. It is run by Fergus Duncan (The Small Controller). Five engines appear in the books. Three diesel locomotives are mentioned in the companion books: Sigrid of Arlesdale, Blister I and Blister II.

Rex
Rex is a green  who worked on an unnamed railway on the mainland with Mike and Bert until it closed. He is based on the Ravenglass & Eskdale locomotive River Esk. He was built by Davey Paxman in 1923.

Mike
Mike is a red  who worked on the mainland with Rex and Bert. He is based on the Ravenglass & Eskdale's River Mite.

Bert
Bert is a blue  who worked with Mike and Rex.

Jock
Jock is a yellow  built by the Arlesdale Railway in 1976 to cover a shortage of power. He first appeared in Jock the New Engine. He is based on Northern Rock.

Frank
Frank is a  who appeared in Jock The New Engine. He is based on Perkins.

Privately owned

Stepney (Bluebell Railway, ex-London, Brighton and South Coast Railway No. 55)
Stepney is a real-life LB&SCR A1X class  who featured in the book Stepney the "Bluebell" Engine. He was the first preserved engine of the Bluebell Railway in East Sussex.

Neil (Sodor & Mainland Railway Number 2)
Neil is a  box tank locomotive who appears in the book Very Old Engines

Bill and Ben (Sodor China Clay Company numbers 1 & 2)
Bill (1) and Ben (No.2) are orange  engines who work for the Sodor China Clay . They both have saddle tanks which cover their smokeboxes, but not their fireboxes. They have 'SCC' painted in yellow on their Saddle tanks, and underneath are their names on brown nameplates; their numbers are painted on their smokeboxes, under 'Brendam Bay'. Apart from their nameplates and numbers, they are absolutely identical from the outset — which can be confusing for other locomotives. Bill and Ben are based on Alfred and Judy, two engines built by Bagnall's of Stafford, who worked at Par, Cornwall. They are unusually low, allowing them to fit under a narrow rail bridge that taller engines could not access without being heavily cut down in size. Alfred and Judy are both preserved at the Bodmin and Wenford Railway.

Bill and Ben first appeared in the book Main Line Engines and played a major role in Thomas and the Twins.

Mavis (Ffarquhar Quarry Company)
Mavis is a  shunting locomotive belonging to the Ffarquhar Quarry Co. She sometimes brings Toby's trucks down the line when he is busy. Mavis is based on a British Rail Class 04, some of which were fitted with the sideplates and cowcatcher for use on the Wisbech and Upwell Tramway. She was built by the Drewry Car Company  and arrived on Sodor in 1962. She first appeared in the book Tramway Engines. She was named after the Rev W. Awdry's neighbour in Rodborough, Stroud.

Wilbert (Dean Forest Railway, ex-National Coal Board No. 3806)
Wilbert is a real-life Hunslet Austerity 0-6-0ST from the Dean Forest Railway heritage railway. His visit to Sodor is the subject of the book Wilbert the Forest Engine.

Other

Other Railway Engines
Various locomotives from the 'Other Railway' - the British national rail network - have visited the Fat Controller's Railway, both on regular trains to-and-from the mainland, or for special events.

Jinty, an LMS Fowler Class 3F, and Pug, an LMS Kitson 0-4-0ST, came to Sodor on loan to relieve Thomas and Percy on their branch line, in The Eight Famous Engines.

Diesel is a black British Rail Class 08 diesel shunter who was on trial for a short time in the spring of 1957.

GWR 3700 Class 3440 City of Truro
The City of Truro visited Sodor in 1957 on a railtour from the mainland and stayed for one night.

LNER Class A3 4472 Flying Scotsman
The Flying Scotsman visited Sodor in late 1967 during the period when he was in the ownership of Alan Pegler.

Non-rail vehicles
Terence is an orange caterpillar tractor first seen in Tank Engine Thomas Again. He is based on a Caterpillar Model 70.
Bertie is a red bus introduced in Thomas and Bertie. He is based on the Leyland Tiger. 
Trevor is a traction engine who was introduced and rescued by Edward in Saved from Scrap. He is based on the William Foster & Co. Traction Engine No. 14593. 
Harold is a white helicopter first shown in Percy and Harold. He is based on the Sikorsky S-55. 
George is a green steamroller appearing in Steamroller and Thomas Comes Home. He is based on an Aveling-Barford R class steamroller. 
Caroline is a car who appears in the story Train Stops Play. She is based on a Morris Oxford Bluenose Saloon. 
Bulgy is a double-decker bus first shown in Bulgy. He is based on the AEC Regent III that served many of London's bus routes in the 1940s and 1950s.
Bulstrode is a grumpy, rude self-propelled barge appearing in Bulstrode. He is based on a 1920s self-propelled coastal barge.

People

Sir Topham Hatt

Sir Topham Hatt, better known as The Fat Controller, is the head of the main rail company on Sodor. His son Charles Topham Hatt II succeeded him in 1954, and his grandson Stephen Topham Hatt III became the Fat Controller in 1984.

Sir Handel Brown
Sir Handel Brown is the head of the Skarloey Railway.

Peter Sam
Peter Sam, known as The Thin Controller, is the vice president of the Skarloey Railway.

Fergus Duncan
Fergus Duncan, known as The Small Controller, is the owner of the Arlesdale Railway. Despite being known as The Small Controller, he is taller than both the Fat Controller and the Thin Controller.

The Fat & Thin Clergymen
The Fat and Thin Clergymen are two clergymen with a strong interest in the railways of the Island of Sodor. The Thin Clergyman is an author and is strongly hinted to be the Rev. Wilbert Awdry. The Fat Clergyman, who records moving pictures, is implied to be the Rev. Wilbert Awdry's real-life friend, the Rev. Teddy Boston.

References

External links

The Railway Series characters
Literary characters introduced in 1945
Railway Series